Aaron Colin Guiel (born October 5, 1972) is a Canadian former professional baseball outfielder.

Career

Minor leagues and Mexico
Guiel was drafted out of Kwantlen College by the California Angels in the 21st round of the 1992 Major League Baseball draft. In his first year with Midland, he played mostly third base and hit .269 for the third consecutive season.

On August 23, 1997, the Angels traded him to the San Diego Padres for catcher Angelo Encarnación. Guiel began  with Triple-A Las Vegas and hit .311 in 60 games. He started  in Las Vegas again, but hit just .245 and became a minor league free agent at the end of the season.

On March 18, Guiel signed with the Oakland Athletics but was released twelve days later on March 30. He then spent two months playing for the Oaxaca Warriors in the Mexican League before being signed by the Kansas City Royals on June 13.

Kansas City Royals
Guiel spent the rest of the  season with the Triple-A Omaha Golden Spikes. After re-signing with the Royals in 2002 and hitting .353 with Omaha, he was called up to the major leagues and made his debut on June 22, striking out in his only at-bat. He began  in the minors again then was called up in May. He stayed in the majors for the rest of the season hitting .277 in 99 games. He missed part of the  season with an eye injury but hit only .156 when he was healthy.

In , Guiel played most of the season with Triple-A Omaha until an August call-up. With Omaha, he hit .276 with a career-high 30 home runs and 95 RBI. He also hit .294 in the majors after being called up. Before the regular season began, Guiel played for Canada in the 2006 World Baseball Classic. In the tournament, he went 2-9 as Team Canada was eliminated in the first round. On July 5, after having spent most of the season with Omaha, he was claimed off waivers by the New York Yankees.

New York Yankees
In his first game with the Yankees, Guiel went 1–3 with a walk and 3 runs scored. Overall with the Yankees, he hit .256 with 4 home runs and 11 RBI while playing right field and first base.

Tokyo Yakult Swallows
For the  season, Guiel signed with the Tokyo Yakult Swallows of Japan's Central League, hitting 35 home runs with 79 RBI. In , he hit only .200 being limited to just 79 games due to an elbow injury.

Personal
His brother is former outfielder Jeff Guiel. Has an older brother Sean.

References

External links

1972 births
Living people
Arizona League Padres players
Baseball people from British Columbia
Baseball players at the 1999 Pan American Games
Canadian expatriate baseball players in Japan
Canadian expatriate baseball players in Mexico
Canadian expatriate baseball players in the United States
Cedar Rapids Kernels players
Columbus Clippers players
Kansas City Royals players
Lake Elsinore Storm players
Las Vegas Stars (baseball) players
Major League Baseball players from Canada
Major League Baseball outfielders
Mexican League baseball right fielders
Midland Angels players
Mobile BayBears players
New York Yankees players
Nippon Professional Baseball left fielders
Nippon Professional Baseball right fielders
Omaha Royals players
Pan American Games bronze medalists for Canada
Pan American Games medalists in baseball
Sportspeople from Vancouver
Tokyo Yakult Swallows players
Wichita Wranglers players
World Baseball Classic players of Canada
2006 World Baseball Classic players
Medalists at the 1999 Pan American Games